Tréméven is a commune in the Finistère department of Brittany in north-western France.

Population
Inhabitants of Tréméven are called in French Trémévénois.

Map

Breton language
The municipality launched a linguistic plan through Ya d'ar brezhoneg on March 8, 2005.

In 2008, 24.11% of primary-school children attended bilingual schools.

International relations
Treméven is twinned with the village of Monivea in Ireland.

See also
Communes of the Finistère department
Entry on sculptor of Tréméven war memorial Jean Joncourt

References

External links

Mayors of Finistère Association 

Communes of Finistère